AmpliChip is a family of clinical tests from the Swiss healthcare company Hoffmann-La Roche which aim to find out the patients' genotype using micro-array technology.  The tests include the CYP450 Test and the P53 Test.  The CYP450 Test was approved by the U.S. Food and Drug Administration.

References

Microarrays